Mineral Township may refer to the following townships in the United States:

 Mineral Township, Bureau County, Illinois
 Mineral Township, Cherokee County, Kansas
 Mineral Township, Barry County, Missouri
 Mineral Township, Venango County, Pennsylvania